Connell is a surname.  Notable people with the name may include:

Brian Connell, New Zealand National Party politician from 2002 to 2008.
Desmond Connell (1926–2017), Cardinal Archbishop of Dublin and Primate of Ireland
Charles Connell (1810–1873), Canadian politician
Charles Robert Connell (1864–1922), US Congressman from Pennsylvania
Cyril Connell Sr. (1899–1974), former rugby league footballer, administrator and University registrar
Cyril Connell Jr. (1928–2009), former rugby league five-eighth, former scout for Brisbane Broncos
Evan S. Connell (1924–2013), American novelist
Elizabeth Connell (1946–2012), South African-born operatic soprano
Elizabeth Connell (doctor) (1925–2018), an American doctor and proponent of women's reproductive health
Francis Jeremiah Connell (1888–1967), redemptorist, priest, theologian, professor at Catholic University of America
George Connell (disambiguation), multiple people
Gary Connell, English rugby league footballer of the 1970s and 1980s
Jane Connell (1925–2013), American actress
John Connell (1923–2015), American actor
Joseph H. Connell (1923–2020), American ecologist
Laurie Connell (1946–1996), Australian businessman and horse racing enthusiast
Martin Connell (businessman), Canadian businessman and philanthropist
Pat Connell, American politician
Raewyn Connell (widely known as R.W. Connell; born 1944), Australian sociologist
Richard Connell (1893–1949), American author
Richard E. Connell (1857–1912), US Congressman from New York
William Connell (disambiguation), multiple people, including:
William Connell (1827–1909), US Congressman from Pennsylvania
William James Connell (1846–1924), US Congressman from Nebraska

English-language surnames